Cedar Creek is a stream in Henry County in the U.S. state of Missouri.

Cedar Creek was so named on account of cedar timber lining its course.

See also
List of rivers of Missouri

References

Rivers of Henry County, Missouri
Rivers of Missouri